The year 2000 is the second year in the history of King of the Cage, a mixed martial arts promotion based in The United States. In 2000 King of the Cage held 5 events, beginning with  Desert Storm.

Title fights

Events list

KOTC 2: Desert Storm

KOTC 2: Desert Storm was an event held on February 5, 2000, at The Soboba Casino in San Jacinto, California, United States.

Results

KOTC 3: Knockout Nightmare

KOTC 3: Knockout Nightmare was an event held on April 15, 2000, at The Soboba Casino in San Jacinto, California, United States.

Results

KOTC 4: Gladiators

KOTC 4: Gladiators was an event held on June 24, 2000, at The Soboba Casino in San Jacinto, California, United States.

Results

KOTC 5: Cage Wars

KOTC 5: Cage Wars was an event held on September 16, 2000, at The Soboba Casino in San Jacinto, California, United States.

Results

KOTC 6: Road Warriors

KOTC 6: Road Warriors was an event held on November 29, 2000, at The Soaring Eagle Casino in Mount Pleasant, Michigan, United States.

Results

See also 
 King of the Cage
 List of King of the Cage events
 List of King of the Cage champions

References

King of the Cage events
2000 in mixed martial arts